An unmarked grave is one that lacks a marker, headstone, or nameplate indicating that a body is buried there. However, in cultures that mark burial sites, the phrase unmarked grave has taken on a metaphorical meaning.

Metaphorical meaning
As a figure of speech, a common meaning of the term "unmarked grave" is consignment to an ignominious end. A grave monument (or headstone) is a sign of respect or fondness, erected with the intention of commemorating and remembering a person.

Criminals
Conversely, a deliberately unmarked grave may signify disdain and contempt. The underlying intention of some unmarked graves may be to suggest that the person buried is not worthy of commemoration, and should therefore be completely ignored and forgotten, e.g., school shooters Seung-Hui Cho and Adam Lanza.

Unmarked graves have long been used to bury executed criminals as an added degree of disgrace. Similarly, many 18th and 19th century prisons and mental asylums historically used numbered (but otherwise featureless) markers in their inmate cemeteries, which allowed for record-keeping and visitations while also minimizing the shame associated with having one's family name on permanent display in such a disreputable context. Plot E at Oise-Aisne American Cemetery (consisting entirely of soldiers executed for rape and/or murder) is a rare example of this policy persisting into the 20th century. 

More recently, the practice has been to cremate and secretly scatter the ashes of notorious criminals in some anonymous place. Cremation and secret scattering of the ashes also has the additional effect of removing all possibility of there being a grave to visit in the future.  This was the fate of Nazi war criminals such as Adolf Eichmann, Hermann Göring, Heinrich Himmler, Fritz Sauckel, and Julius Streicher. The remains of British serial killers Myra Hindley, Dr Harold Shipman, and Fred West were treated in the same way. A similar proceeding was carried out with the remains of Martin Bormann, who committed suicide shortly after the fall of Berlin in 1945, and whose remains, found in 1972 and identified in 1998, were disposed of in the Baltic Sea in 1999. More recently, the ashes of Abimael Guzmán the leader of the Peruvian Maoist Shining Path terrorist organization, who died in prison in 2021, had his remains secretly disposed of by Peruvian authorities.

The headstone of disgraced television presenter and alleged sex offender Jimmy Savile was removed and destroyed three weeks after being erected, when posthumous allegations of sexual abuse over decades came to light.

Judaism
In Judaism, contact with a corpse confers uncleanness (see Numbers 19:11-22 and Tractate Oholoth in the Mishna). Cohanim, descendants of Aaron, are prohibited from approaching within 4 cubits of a grave, except for when a funeral is of a close relative. Thus, an unmarked grave opens up the possibility that a pious Jew could become defiled without being aware that it happened. The Jews of early times, therefore, sought to avoid unmarked graves by two means: clearly designating cemeteries beyond the limits of their villages and cities, and making graves and tombs obvious by whitewashing them. This is the background for Jesus' comparison of the Pharisees of his time to white-washed tombs (see Matthew 23:27-28) and to "unmarked graves, which men walk over without knowing it" (Luke 11:44). Jesus warned that the Pharisees were defiling others by their hypocrisy, misplaced priorities, and selfish ambition.

Other reasons for unmarked graves
However, disdain and contempt are not the only reasons why graves remain unmarked.

According to legend, Genghis Khan asked to be buried without markings or any sign, and after he died, his body was returned to Mongolia.

As Alicia Hoyt reports: "Historically, financial limitations and social status were factors in whether a person (even a famous one) was awarded a big fancy marker. Mass, unmarked graves were also common in times of widespread disease or war; plus older markers simply deteriorated over time or were stolen. Another reason might be: other gravesites reflect the wishes of the deceased or family members who simply don't want a marker, can't decide on wording, or plan to add one down the line when a loved one passes away and joins them in the plot."

Additionally, "modern celebrity concerns" may be related to a desire for privacy or to avoid vandalism. For example, basketball player Kobe Bryant and his daughter Gianna, singer Michael Jackson, businessman and Apple's Founder Steve Jobs, Academy Award-winning actor George C. Scott, musician Frank Zappa, Roy Orbison, comedian John Belushi, and writer H. P. Lovecraft (discussed below) are notable people whose burial sites have been left unmarked (or marked deceptively) for reasons that are not financial.

In cases when a person's remains are lost, a cenotaph may be erected. This is what happened to comedian John Belushi. The gravestone at his grave in a Martha's Vineyard cemetery was removed and relocated, after operators of the cemetery found many signs of vandalism and rowdiness, where his body lies. In response, a cenotaph gravestone was erected at a nearby empty grave, to deter disrespectful visitors, leaving his actual final resting place without a marker. Another Belushi cenotaph gravestone was erected by his family in a Chicago area cemetery, at the Belushi family plot, where his parents are now buried. Similarly, when H. P. Lovecraft's headstone in Providence, Rhode Island was stolen, a replacement marker was erected in a different location.

Deceased monarchs and princes of Saudi Arabia are buried in unmarked graves in the public Al Oud cemetery in Riyadh. There is also typically no public funeral or national show of mourning. The Wahhabi sect of Sunni Islam practiced in Saudi Arabia considers public shows of grief or memorials to the dead to be un-Islamic, and therefore the royal family typically practices austere, private burials.

See also
Burial
Canadian Indian residential school gravesites

References

Anonymity
Metaphors
Burial monuments and structures